William Brownlow may refer to:

William Gannaway Brownlow (1805–1877), governor of Tennessee
Sir William Brownlow, 1st Baronet (c. 1595–1666), English politician and barrister
Sir William Brownlow, 4th Baronet (1665–1701), British Member of Parliament for Peterborough and Bishop's Castle
William Brownlow (1683–1739) (1683–1711), Irish MP for Armagh County 1711–1739
William Brownlow (1726–1794), Irish MP for Armagh County 1753–1794 and Strabane
William Brownlow (1755–1815), Irish MP for Armagh County 1795–1798, British MP for Armagh
William Brownlow, 3rd Baron Lurgan (1858–1937), Anglo-Irish aristocrat, landowner, hotel proprietor and sportsman
William Brownlow (British Army officer) (1921–1998), British Army officer and MP for North Down 
William Brownlow (bishop) (1830–1901), English prelate of the Roman Catholic Church

See also
Brownlow baronets
Brownlow (surname)